Dubreuilville is a township in the Canadian province of Ontario, located in the Algoma District. Established as a company town in 1961 by the Dubreuil Brothers lumber company, Dubreuilville was incorporated as a municipality in 1977.

Dubreuilville sponsored Canada's Strongest Man contests in 2015, 2016, and 2019.

Demographics 

Population trend:
 Population in 2016: 613
 Population in 2011: 635
 Population in 2006: 773
 Population in 2001: 967
 Population in 1996: 990
 Population in 1991: 983

Mother tongue:
 English as first language: 14.2%
 French as first language: 84.2%
 English and French as first language: 
 Other as first language: 1.6%

See also
List of townships in Ontario
List of francophone communities in Ontario

References

External links

Company towns in Canada
Municipalities in Algoma District
Single-tier municipalities in Ontario
Township municipalities in Ontario